Awara Zindagi is a 1989 Hindi film, directed by A. A. Darpan, starring Raj Kiran, Saloni, Nilesh Malhotra, Prema Narayan, Mushtaq Merchant and Kadar Khan.

Cast
Raj Kiran as Tony
Saloni as Sita
Nilesh Malhotra as Sony
Prema Narayan as Salu
Mushtaq Merchant as Mony
Kader Khan as Boss
Mazhar Khan as Ganpath Dada
Mushtaq Khan as Fernandes
Dev Kumar as Sherra
Sudhir as Tiger

Music
Music Director: Jagdish J.
"Aaye Sawan Ki Rut" v1 - Anuradha Paudwal, Poornima
"Aaye Sawan Ki Rut" v2 - Anuradha Paudwal, Poornima
"Awara Zindagi" - Anwar
"Kahin Rut Badal Na Jaaye" v1 - Anwar
"Kahin Rut Badal Na Jaaye" v2 - Anwar
"Kisi Surat Bhi" v1 - Anwar
"Kisi Surat Bhi" v2 - Anwar
"Masti Mein" - Manna Dey
"Mehnat Na Banaye" - Anwar

References

External links
 

1989 films
1980s Hindi-language films